Diocese of Vayots Dzor ( Vayots Dzori t'em), is one of the newest dioceses of the Armenian Apostolic Church covering the Vayots Dzor Province of  Armenia. The diocesan headquarters are located in the town of Yeghegnadzor. The seat of the bishop is the 12th-century Holy Mother of God Cathedral of Yeghegnadzor.

The diocese was established in 2010, when it was separated from the Diocese of Syunik. The prelacy building is located on the Grigor Narekatsi Street in the town of Yeghagndzor.

Structure
The primate of the diocese is archbishop Abraham Mkrtchyan who is in service since the formation of the diocese in December 2010. The vicar is archimandrite Zareh Kabaghyan, while the remaining 5 priests are serving the 17 acting places of worship within the Vayots Dzor Province.

The diocese has the following departments: 
Administration
Media
Christian education centre
Youth union
Creativity group

Active churches
Here is the list of churches (10), monasteries (5) and chapels (2) functioning under the jurisdiction of the Diocese of Vayots Dzor, along with their location and year of consecration:

Churches
Holy Mother of God Cathedral, Yeghnadzor, 12th century
Holy Mother of God Church, Areni, 1321
Zorats Surp Stepanos Church, Yeghegis, 14th century
Holy Mother of God Church, Khachik, 1681
Holy Mother of God Church, Martiros, 1866
Surp Hakob Church, Vernashen, 19th century
Saint Trdat Church, Vayk, 2000
Saint Anne Church, Malishka, 2000
Saint Mariam Church, Aghavnadzor, 2001
Saint Gayane Church, Jermuk, 2007

Monasteries
Noravank near Areni, 1205
Spitakavor Monastery near Vernashen, 1321
Arkaz Holy Cross Monastery near Vernashen, 1872

Chapels
Surp Mariam Chapel, Martiros, 2004
Saint Gayane Chapel, Kechut, 2007
Surp Yeghishe Chapel, Gndevaz, 2013

Inactive/ruined churches and monasteries
Arates Monastery near Arates, 7th century
Tanahat Monastery near Vernashen, 8-13th centuries
Karevank Monastery near Yeghegis, 9-10th centuries
Shativank near Shatin, 929
Gndevank near Gndevaz, 936
Tsaghats Kar Monastery near Artabuynk, 10th century
Hermon Monastery near Yeghegis, 10th century
Holy Mother of God Church, Yeghegis, 10th century
Khotakerats Monastery near Khachik, 10th century
Saint Zion Monastery near Herher, 10-13th centuries
Surp Mamas Monastery near Salli, 12-13th centuries
Surp Nshan Church, Yeghegis, 13th century
Martirosavank Monastery, Martiros, 1286
Holy Mother of God Church , Gndevaz, 1686
Church of the Holy Archangels, Horbategh, 1692

Primates
Archbishop Abraham Mkrtchyan (10 December 2010 - )

References

External links
Churches of Vayots Dzor Province

Vayots
Christianity in Armenia
Vayots Dzor Province
Oriental Orthodox dioceses in Armenia